Eduardo Matte Pérez (1847–1902) was a Chilean lawyer and member of the influential Matte family. He was the brother of Augusto Matte. He was minister of foreign affairs and colonization (1889–1890) and interior (1892). He was a member of the Chamber of Deputies of Chile (1873–1876, 1879–1891, 1894–1900) and Senate of Chile (1900–1902).

Bibliographical References
 Diccionario Biográfico de Chile; Empresa Periodística "Chile"; Imprenta y Litografía Universo; Santiago, Chile, 1936; Tomo II.
 Diccionario histórico, Biográfico y Bibliográfico de Chile: 1800–1928; Virgilio Figueroa; Establecimientos Gráficos "Balcells & Co."; Santiago, Chile, 1928; Tomo III.
 Genealogía de Eduardo Matte Pérez

External links
Reseña biográfica en el sitio de la Biblioteca del Congreso Nacional de Chile.

1847 births
1902 deaths
Members of the Senate of Chile
People from Santiago
Presidents of the Chamber of Deputies of Chile
Government ministers of Chile
Place of birth missing
19th-century Chilean lawyers